Tatjana Đurković (born 5 August 1996) is a Montenegrin football defender.

External links 
 

1996 births
Living people
Montenegrin women's footballers
Women's association football defenders
Montenegro women's international footballers
ŽFK Ekonomist players